Hachette is a French surname. Notable people with the surname include:

Jean Nicolas Pierre Hachette (1769–1834), French mathematician
Jeanne Hachette, French heroine
Louis Christophe François Hachette (1800–1864), French publisher

French-language surnames